Draba is a large genus of flowering plants in the family Brassicaceae, commonly known as whitlow-grasses (though they are not related to the true grasses).

Species
There are over 400 species:

Draba abajoensis Windham & Al-Shehbaz
Draba × abiskoensis O.E.Schulz
Draba × abiskojokkensis O.E.Schulz
Draba acaulis Boiss.
Draba affghanica Boiss.
Draba aizoides L.
Draba alajica Litv.
Draba alberti Regel & Schmalh.
Draba albertina Greene
Draba alchemilloides Gilg
Draba × algida Adams ex DC.
Draba alpina L.
Draba altaica (C.A.Mey.) Bunge
Draba alticola Kom.
Draba alyssoides Humb. & Bonpl. ex DC.
Draba × amandae O.E.Schulz
Draba × ambigua Ledeb.
Draba amoena O.E.Schulz
Draba amplexicaulis Franch.
Draba aprica Beadle
Draba arabisans Michx.
Draba araboides Wedd.
Draba araratica Rupr.
Draba arauquensis Santana
Draba arbuscula Hook.f.
Draba arctogena (Ekman) Ekman
Draba aretioides Humb. & Bonpl. ex DC.
Draba argentifolia Al-Shehbaz
Draba argyrea Rydb.
Draba arida C.L.Hitchc.
Draba arseniewii (B.Fedtsch.) Gilg ex Tolm.
Draba aspera Bertol.
Draba × asplundii O.E.Schulz
Draba asprella Greene
Draba asterophora Payson
Draba atacamensis Gilg
Draba atuelica Chodat & Wilczek
Draba aubrietioides Jafri
Draba aurea Vahl ex Hornem.
Draba aureola S.Watson
Draba australis R.Br. ex Hook.f.
Draba azorellicola O.E.Schulz
Draba bagmatiensis Al-Shehbaz
Draba baicalensis Tolm.
Draba bajtenovii Veselova
Draba barclayana Al-Shehbaz
Draba bartholomewii Al-Shehbaz
Draba beamanii Rollins
Draba bellardii S.F.Blake
Draba bertiscea Lakusic & Stevanovic
Draba bhutanica H.Hara
Draba bifurcata (C.L.Hitchc.) Al-Shehbaz & Windham
Draba × blyttii O.E.Schulz
Draba bocheri Gjaerev. & Ryvarden
Draba boliviana O.E.Schulz
Draba × borderi O.E.Schulz
Draba borealis DC.
Draba boyacana Al-Shehbaz
Draba brachycarpa Nutt.
Draba brachystemon DC.
Draba brachystylis Rydb.
Draba brackenridgei A.Gray
Draba × brandtii O.E.Schulz
Draba breweri S.Watson
Draba bruniifolia Steven
Draba bryoides DC.
Draba burkartiana O.E.Schulz
Draba burkei (C.L.Hitchc.) Windham & Beilstein
Draba × buschii O.E.Schulz
Draba cachemirica Gand.
Draba cacuminum E.Ekman
Draba calcicola O.E.Schulz
Draba californica (Jeps.) Rollins & R.A.Price
Draba cana Rydb.
Draba cantabriae (Laínz) Laínz
Draba cappadocica Boiss. & Balansa
Draba cardaminiflora Kom.
Draba carnosula O.E.Schulz
Draba chamissonis G.Don
Draba cheiranthoides Hook.f.
Draba chionophila S.F.Blake
Draba chodatii O.E.Schulz
Draba cholaensis W.W.Sm.
Draba chrysantha S.Watson
Draba cinerea Adams
Draba cocuyana Al-Shehbaz
Draba cocuyensis Santana & J.O.Rangel
Draba compacta Schott, Nyman & Kotschy
Draba corrugata S.Watson
Draba corymbosa R.Br. ex DC.
Draba crassa Rydb.
Draba crassifolia Graham
Draba cretica Boiss. & Heldr.
Draba cruciata Payson
Draba cryptantha Hook.f.
Draba cuatrecasana J.O.Rangel & Santana
Draba cuneifolia Nutt.
Draba cusickii C.B.Rob. ex O.E.Schulz
Draba cuspidata M.Bieb.
Draba cuzcoensis O.E.Schulz
Draba czuensis Revuschkin & A.L.Ebel
Draba darwasica Lipsky
Draba daurica DC.
Draba × davosiana Brügger
Draba × decipiens O.E.Schulz
Draba dedeana Boiss. & Reut.
Draba demareei Wiggins
Draba densifolia Nutt.
Draba depressa Hook.f.
Draba diazii Rivas Mart., M.E.García & Penas
Draba discoidea Wedd.
Draba × districta O.E.Schulz
Draba diversifolia Boiss. & A.Huet
Draba dolomitica Buttler
Draba dorneri Heuff.
Draba draboides (Maxim.) Al-Shehbaz
Draba dubia Suter
Draba ecuadoriana Al-Shehbaz
Draba × ekmaniana Weingerl
Draba elata Hook.f. & Thomson
Draba elegans Boiss.
Draba elisabethae N.Busch
Draba ellipsoidea Hook.f. & Thomson
Draba eriopoda Turcz. ex Ledeb.
Draba extensa Wedd.
Draba exunguiculata (O.E.Schulz) C.L.Hitchc.
Draba falconeri O.E.Schulz
Draba farsetioides Linden & Planch.
Draba fedtschenkoi Gilg ex Tolm.
Draba × ficta Camus ex Hayek
Draba fladnizensis Wulfen
Draba fuhaiensis Z.X.An
Draba funckiana Linden & Planch.
Draba funckii (Turcz.) Al-Shehbaz
Draba funiculosa Hook.f.
Draba gilliesii Hook. & Arn.
Draba glabella Pursh
Draba glacialis Adams
Draba globosa Payson
Draba glomerata Royle
Draba gracillima Hook.f. & Thomson
Draba graminea Greene
Draba grandiflora Hook. & Arn. ex Hook.f.
Draba grayana (Rydb.) C.L.Hitchc.
Draba hallii Hook.f.
Draba hammenii Cuatrec. & Cleef
Draba handelii O.E.Schulz
Draba haradjianii Rech.f.
Draba × harry-smithii O.E.Schulz
Draba haynaldii Stur
Draba hederifolia Coss.
Draba helleriana Greene
Draba hemsleyana Gilg
Draba herzogii O.E.Schulz
Draba hidalgensis Calderón
Draba himachalensis Al-Shehbaz
Draba hirta L.
Draba hispanica Boiss.
Draba hispida Willd.
Draba hissarica Lipsky
Draba hitchcockii Rollins
Draba hookeri Walp.
Draba hoppeana Rchb.
Draba howellii S.Watson
Draba huetii Boiss.
Draba humillima O.E.Schulz
Draba hyperborea (L.) Desv.
Draba hystrix Hook.f. & Thomson
Draba imeretica (Rupr.) Rupr.
Draba implexa Rollins
Draba incana L.
Draba incerta Payson
Draba incompta Steven
Draba incrassata (Rollins) Rollins & R.A.Price
Draba inexpectata S.L.Welsh
Draba inquisiviana Al-Shehbaz
Draba insularis Pissjauk
Draba × intermedia Hegetschw.
Draba involucrata (W.W.Sm.) W.W.Sm.
Draba jaegeri Munz & I.M.Johnst.
Draba japonica Maxim.
Draba jorullensis Kunth
Draba jucunda W.W.Sm.
Draba juvenilis Kom.
Draba kassii S.L.Welsh
Draba × kingii O.E.Schulz
Draba kitadakensis Koidz.
Draba kluanei G.A.Mulligan
Draba kodarica O.D.Nikif.
Draba koeiei Rech.f.
Draba kongboiana Al-Shehbaz
Draba korabensis Kümmerle & Degen
Draba korschinskyi (O. Fedtsch.) Pohle ex O. Fedtsch.
Draba korshinskyi (O.Fedtsch.) Pohle
Draba kotschyi Stur
Draba kuemmerlei Stevan. & D.Lakusic
Draba kuramensis Yunusov
Draba kusnezowii (Turcz. ex Ledeb.) Hayek
Draba kuznetsovii (Turcz.) Hayek
Draba lacaitae Boiss.
Draba laconica Stevan. & Kit Tan
Draba lactea Adams
Draba ladina Braun-Blanq.
Draba ladyginii Pohle
Draba lanceolata Royle
Draba lapaziana Al-Shehbaz
Draba × larssonii O.E.Schulz
Draba lasiocarpa Rochel
Draba lasiophylla Royle
Draba × lastrungica O.E.Schulz
Draba × lattinicciae Gamisans
Draba laurentiana Fernald
Draba lemmonii S.Watson
Draba lichiangensis W.W.Sm.
Draba × lindblomii O.E.Schulz
Draba lindenii (Hook.) Planch. ex Sprague
Draba linearifolia L.L.Lou & T.Y.Cheo
Draba lipskyi Tolm.
Draba litamo L.Uribe
Draba loayzana Al-Shehbaz
Draba loiseleurii Boiss.
Draba lonchocarpa Rydb.
Draba longisiliqua Schmalh. ex Akinf.
Draba ludlowiana Jafri
Draba lunkii V.I.Dorof.
Draba lutescens Coss.
Draba macbeathiana Al-Shehbaz
Draba macleanii Hook.f.
Draba macounii O.E.Schulz
Draba magadanensis Berkut. & A.P.Khokhr.
Draba magellanica Lam.
Draba maguirei C.L.Hitchc.
Draba majae Berkut. & A.P.Khokhr.
Draba malpighiacea Windham & Al-Shehbaz
Draba marinellii (Pamp.) O.E.Schulz
Draba matangensis O.E.Schulz
Draba matthioloides Gilg ex O.E.Schulz
Draba melanopus Kom.
Draba meskhetica Chinth.
Draba micheorum Al-Shehbaz
Draba × microcarpa (Trautv.) O.E.Schulz
Draba microcarpella A.N.Vassiljeva & Golosk.
Draba micropetala Hook.
Draba mieheorum Al-Shehbaz
Draba mingrelica Schischk. ex Grossh.
Draba × mixta O.E.Schulz
Draba mogollonica Greene
Draba mollissima Steven
Draba mongolica Turcz.
Draba monoensis Rollins & R.A.Price
Draba montbretiana Sommier & Levier
Draba muralis L.
Draba murrayi G.A.Mulligan
Draba nana Stapf
Draba narmanensis Yild.
Draba nemorosa L.
Draba nivalis Lilj.
Draba nivicola Rose
Draba norvegica Gunnerus
Draba nuda (Bél.) Al-Shehbaz & M.Koch
Draba nylamensis Al-Shehbaz
Draba oariocarpa O.E.Schulz
Draba oblongata R.Br. ex DC
Draba obovata Benth.
Draba ochroleuca Bunge
Draba ochropetala O.E.Schulz
Draba odudiana Lipsky
Draba ogilviensis Hultén
Draba olgae Regel & Schmalh.
Draba oligosperma Hook.
Draba olympicoides Strobl
Draba oreades Schrenk
Draba oreadum Maire
Draba oreibata J.F.Macbr. & Payson
Draba oreodoxa W.W.Sm.
Draba ossetica (Rupr.) Sommier & Levier
Draba ovibovina (E.Ekman) E.Ekman
Draba oxycarpa Sommerf.
Draba pacheri Stur
Draba pachythyrsa Triana & Planch.
Draba paishanensis T.Mori
Draba pakistanica Jafri
Draba palanderiana Kjellm.
Draba pamirica (O.Fedtsch.) Pohle
Draba pamplonensis Planch. & Linden ex Triana & Planch.
Draba parnassica Boiss.
Draba parviflora (Regel) O.E.Schulz
Draba pauciflora R.Br.
Draba paucifructa Clokey & C.L.Hitchc.
Draba paysonii J.F.Macbr.
Draba pectinipila Rollins
Draba pedicellata (Rollins & R.A.Price) Windham
Draba pennell-hazenii O.E.Schulz
Draba pennellii Rollins
Draba × perdubia O.E.Schulz
Draba peruviana (DC.) O.E.Schulz
Draba petrophila Greene
Draba physocarpa Kom.
Draba pickeringii A.Gray
Draba × pilgeri O.E.Schulz
Draba pilosa Adams ex DC.
Draba platycarpa Torr. & A.Gray
Draba pohlei Tolm.
Draba poluniniana Al-Shehbaz
Draba polyphylla O.E.Schulz
Draba polytricha Ledeb.
Draba popocatepetlensis Hemsl.
Draba porsildii Mulligan
Draba praealta Greene
Draba primuloides Turcz.
Draba pseudocheiranthoides Al-Shehbaz
Draba × pseudonivalis N.Busch
Draba × pseudovesicaria O.E.Schulz
Draba pterosperma Payson
Draba pulchella Willd. ex DC.
Draba pulcherrima Gilg
Draba pulvinata Turcz.
Draba pusilla F.Phil. ex Phil.
Draba pycnophylla Turcz.
Draba pygmaea Turcz. ex N.Busch
Draba radicans Royle
Draba ramosissima Desv.
Draba ramulosa Rollins
Draba rectifructa C.L.Hitchc.
Draba remotiflora O.E.Schulz
Draba reptans (Lam.) Fernald
Draba rigida Willd.
Draba ritacuvana Al-Shehbaz
Draba riveti Benoist
Draba rositae Santana & J.O.Rangel
Draba rosularis Boiss.
Draba ruaxes Payson & H.St.John
Draba sachalinensis (Schmidt) Trautv.
Draba sagasteguii Al-Shehbaz
Draba sakuraii Makino
Draba sambukii Tolm.
Draba sanctae-martae O.E.Schulz
Draba sapozhnikovii A.L.Ebel
Draba sarycheleki Veselova
Draba sauteri Hoppe
Draba scabra C.A.Mey.
Draba × schaeferi O.E.Schulz
Draba schultzei O.E.Schulz
Draba schusteri O.E.Schulz
Draba scopulorum Wedd.
Draba scotteri G.A.Mulligan
Draba sekiyana Ohwi
Draba senilis O.E.Schulz
Draba sericea Santana & J.O.Rangel
Draba serpentina (Tiehm & P.K.Holmgren) Al-Shehbaz & Windham
Draba setosa Royle
Draba sharsmithii Rollins & R.A.Price
Draba sherriffii Grierson
Draba shiroumana Makino
Draba sibirica (Pall.) Thell.
Draba sierrae Sharsm.
Draba sikkimensis (Hook.f. & T.Anderson) Pohle
Draba siliquosa M.Bieb.
Draba simmonsii Elven & Al-Shehbaz
Draba simonkaiana Jáv.
Draba smithii Gilg & O.E.Schulz
Draba sobolifera Rydb.
Draba solitaria O.E.Schulz
Draba soratensis Wedd.
Draba spectabilis Greene
Draba sphaerocarpa J.F.Macbr. & Payson
Draba sphaeroides Payson
Draba splendens Gilg
Draba × spreadhoroughii O.E.Schulz
Draba spruceana Wedd.
Draba staintonii Jafri ex H.Hara
Draba standleyi J.F.Macbr. & Payson
Draba stellata Jacq.
Draba stenobotrys Gilg & O.E.Schulz
Draba stenocarpa Hook.f. & Thomson
Draba stenoloba Ledeb.
Draba stenopetala Trautv.
Draba steyermarkii Al-Shehbaz
Draba strasseri Greuter
Draba streptobrachia R.A.Price
Draba streptocarpa A.Gray
Draba × sturii Strobl
Draba stylaris J.Gay ex W.D.J.Koch
Draba stylosa Turcz.
Draba subalpina Goodman & C.L.Hitchc.
Draba subamplexicaulis C.A.Mey.
Draba subcapitata Simmons
Draba subfladnizensis Kuvaev
Draba subglabrata (Speg.) O.E.Schulz
Draba subnivalis Braun-Blanq.
Draba subsecunda Sommier & Levier
Draba subumbellata Rollins & R.A.Price
Draba sunhangiana Al-Shehbaz
Draba supranivalis Rupr.
Draba supravillosa A.P.Khokhr.
Draba surculosa Franch.
Draba taimyrensis Tolm.
Draba talassica Pohle
Draba tenerrima O.E.Schulz
Draba thlaspiformis (Phil.) Al-Shehbaz
Draba thylacocarpa (Nábelek) Hedge
Draba tibetica Hook.f. & Thomson
Draba tichomirovii Kozhevn.
Draba tomentosa Clairv.
Draba × tornensis O.E.Schulz
Draba trichocarpa Rollins
Draba trinervis O.E.Schulz
Draba tschuktschorum Trautv.
Draba tucumanensis O.E.Schulz
Draba turczaninowii Pohle & N.Busch
Draba × uczkolensis B.Fedtsch.
Draba × ursorum Gand.
Draba ussuriensis Pohle
Draba venezuelana Al-Shehbaz
Draba ventosa A.Gray
Draba verna (L.) Besser
Draba vesicaria Desv.
Draba violacea DC.
Draba volcanica Benth.
Draba vvedenskyi Kovalevsk.
Draba weberi R.A.Price & Rollins
Draba wiemannii (O.E.Schulz) Hand.-Mazz.
Draba × wilczekii O.E.Schulz
Draba winterbottomii (Hook.f. & Thomson) Pohle
Draba wurdackii Al-Shehbaz
Draba yueii Al-Shehbaz
Draba yukonensis A.E.Porsild
Draba yunnanensis Franch.
Draba yunussovii Tolm.
Draba zangbeiensis L.L.Lu

Gallery

Further reading

References

External links

Jepson Manual Treatment

 
Brassicaceae genera